Nile (born Jenée Denenne Grevious) is an American singer. In 2002, she released her debut album, Born.  She listed family, spirituality and nature as influences in her music. Her music has been described as Bristolian and may be thought of as trip hop.

Biography
Nile is the daughter of a Blackfoot Indian mother and a French father. Explaining why she chose the name Nile, she said "I’m an Aquarius and so Nile stood out for me. Plus it’s easier to say."

References

Living people
Singers from Ohio
1970 births
Place of birth missing (living people)
21st-century American singers
21st-century American women singers
Independiente Records artists